The Kamleshwar Dam, officially known as the "Hiran-I Dam", is a rock-fill embankment dam on the Hiran River in Visavadar, Gujarat State, India. Measuring , the dam is located within the Gir Forest National Park and was completed in 1959 for irrigation purposes. The reservoir created by the dam is known for its populations of birds and mugger crocodiles.

References

External links
Gir National Park

Dams in Gujarat
Rock-filled dams
Tourist attractions in Junagadh district
1959 establishments in Bombay State
Dams completed in 1959
20th-century architecture in India